Dorothy Catherine Jelicich  (née MacDonald, 19 January 1928 – 10 April 2015) was a New Zealand politician of the Labour Party. She served one term in the House of Representatives representing the  electorate, and was afterwards a city councillor in Hamilton and then Manukau.

Early life and family
Jelicich was born in Sydney on 19 January 1928. Her father was a semi-skilled labourer. She was educated at Epsom Girls' Grammar School and the Elam School of Fine Arts. In 1949 she married Paul Jelicich, a bricklayer, and, with family support, she opened a restaurant in the Auckland suburb of Papatoetoe. Purchasing a small dairy farm at Bombay in 1964, the couple took up farming, but in 1970 she became a shoe store manager and then a trade union organiser.

Political career

Jelicich, through her union job, became a member of the Labour Party and became a member of the executive of the  electorate and president of the  electorate committee. She became the first woman in New Zealand parliamentary history to open the Address-in-Reply debate. In  she lost her seat to Mike Minogue.

Following her defeat she stood for the vice-presidency of the Labour Party at the 1976 party conference. She lost to Gerald O'Brien, placing second in the delegate ballot with a credible 344 votes to O'Brien's 585. In early 1977 she stood as a candidate for the Labour Party nomination in the Māngere by-election. She had the backing of both the outgoing MP Colin Moyle, Labour leader Bill Rowling, but regardless she lost out to future Prime Minister David Lange.

She briefly served on the Hamilton City Council after winning a by-election in 1979. She unsuccessfully stood for the Labour nomination at the 1980 Onehunga by-election. Just as in Mangere she gathered much support among local members but again missed out, narrowly losing to Fred Gerbic. In 1982 (via another by-election) she became a Manukau City Councillor, representing Mangere Ward until she retired in 1995.

Honours and awards
In the 1986 New Year Honours, Jelicich was appointed a Companion of the Queen's Service Order for public services. In 1993, she was awarded the New Zealand Suffrage Centennial Medal.

Death
Jelicich died on 10 April 2015 at Middlemore Hospital, Auckland at the age of 87, having been predeceased by her husband in October the previous year. She was survived by their three children.

Notes

References

Women in Parliamentary Life 1970–1990: Hocken Lecture 1993 by Marilyn Waring, p. 32 (Hocken Library, University of Otago, 1994);

External links
Photo of Dorothy Jelicich and Mary Batchelor playing pool in the parliamentary Members' lounge

1928 births
2015 deaths
Politicians from Sydney
Australian emigrants to New Zealand
New Zealand Labour Party MPs
Women members of the New Zealand House of Representatives
People educated at Epsom Girls' Grammar School
Elam Art School alumni
Companions of the Queen's Service Order
New Zealand MPs for North Island electorates
Members of the New Zealand House of Representatives
Unsuccessful candidates in the 1969 New Zealand general election
Unsuccessful candidates in the 1975 New Zealand general election
Unsuccessful candidates in the 1978 New Zealand general election
Manukau City Councillors
Hamilton City Councillors
Recipients of the New Zealand Suffrage Centennial Medal 1993